Corpus Christi Bandits is a 1945 American Western film directed by Wallace Grissell and written by Norman S. Hall. The film stars Allan Lane, Helen Talbot, Jack Kirk, Twinkle Watts, Francis McDonald and Roy Barcroft. The film was released on April 20, 1945, by Republic Pictures.

Plot

Cast  
Allan Lane as Captain James Christie / Corpus Christi Jim
Helen Talbot as Dorothy Adams
Jack Kirk as Editor Alonzo Adams
Twinkle Watts as Nancy Christie
Francis McDonald as Dad Christie
Roy Barcroft as Wade Larkin
Tom London as Henchman Rocky
Kenne Duncan as Henchman Spade
Robert J. Wilke as Henchman Steve 
Ruth Lee as Mom Christie
Ed Cassidy as Marshal Dan Adams
Emmett Vogan as Texas Governor
Dickie Dillon as Brush
Freddie Chapman as Stinky
Shelby Bacon as Moonlight

References

External links 
 

1945 films
1940s English-language films
American Western (genre) films
1945 Western (genre) films
Republic Pictures films
American black-and-white films
1940s American films